Lyudmila Shishova (1 June 1940 – 21 February 2004) was a Soviet fencer and fencing coach. She won gold in the team foil at the 1960 Summer Olympics and a silver in the same event at the 1964 Summer Olympics.

Shishova tried several sports before coming to a fencing school in 1954. From 1960 to 1964 she was a member of the Soviet foil team. In 1969 she received a degree in gynecology from the Nizhny Novgorod State Medical Academy, and after retiring from competitions worked both as a gynecologist and a fencing coach. Her husband, Vitaly Zinkov, and daughter Elvira Zinkova, both competed at the national level in fencing.

References

External links
 

1940 births
2004 deaths
Russian female foil fencers
Soviet female foil fencers
Olympic fencers of the Soviet Union
Fencers at the 1960 Summer Olympics
Fencers at the 1964 Summer Olympics
Olympic gold medalists for the Soviet Union
Olympic silver medalists for the Soviet Union
Olympic medalists in fencing
Medalists at the 1960 Summer Olympics
Medalists at the 1964 Summer Olympics
Sportspeople from Nizhny Novgorod